Okay (sometimes also spelt as O.K.) were a pop group from Frankfurt, Germany.

Their 1987 single "Okay!" reached No. 2 on the German music chart in 1988 and No. 1 on the Austrian chart.

Members 
 Marcus Gabler (a.k.a. Marc Gable) - vocals, keyboards, tapes, mixing
 Nikki - drums, backing vocals
 Robin Otis - bass, backing vocals
 Christian Berg - keyboards, backing vocals

Discography

Albums
 1989: Bang!, CBS

Singles
 1987: "Okay!"
 1988: "E-D-U-C-A-T-I-O-N"
 1989: "The Wild, Wild, Western"
 1990: "1.2.3.4. Une Grande Affaire"
 1991: "World of Illusion"

References

External links
 Official band website
 Okay in Discogs

German dance music groups
Eurodisco groups